

Events 
 January–March 
 January 4 – Britain enters the Seven Years' War against Spain and Naples.
 January 5 – Empress Elisabeth of Russia dies, and is succeeded by her nephew Peter III. Peter, an admirer of Frederick the Great, immediately opens peace negotiations with the Prussians.
 February 5 – The Great Holocaust of the Sikhs is carried out by the forces of Ahmed Shah Abdali in Punjab. In all, around 30,000 men, women and children perish in this campaign of slaughter.
 March 5 – A Royal Navy fleet with 16,000 men departs Britain from Spithead and sets sail toward Cuba in order to seize strategic Spanish Empire possessions in the Americas.
 March 10 – Jean Calas, a 68 year old French merchant convicted unjustly of murdering his son because of religious differences, is brutally executed on orders of the Parliament of Toulouse. After his legs and hips are broken and crushed, Calas is tortured on the breaking wheel (la roue), to remain "in pain and repentance for his crimes and misdeeds, for as long as it shall please God to keep him alive."
 March 17 – The first Saint Patrick's Day Parade in New York City takes place in lower Manhattan, inaugurating an annual tradition; the Ancient Order of the Hibernians organization later becomes the sponsor of the event, which attracts as many a 300,000 marchers in some years.
 March 20 – Innovative publisher Samuel Farley launches the weekly newspaper The American Chronicle, the seventh in New York City.

 April–June 
 April 2 – A powerful earthquake along the border between modern-day Bangladesh and Myanmar causes a tsunami in the Bay of Bengal that kills at least 200 people.
 April 5 – France issues a new ordinance requiring all black and mixed-race Frenchmen to register their identity information with the offices of the Admiralty Court, upon the advice of Guillaume Poncet de la Grave, adviser to King Louis XV. The new rule, which requires both free and enslaved blacks and mulattoes to list data including their age, surname, purpose for which they are residing in France, whether they have been baptized as Christians, where they emigrated from in Africa and the name of the ship upon which they arrived. Previously, the Declaration of 1738 required slave-owners to register their slaves, but placed no requirement on free people.
 May 5 (April 24 O.S.) – The Treaty of Saint Petersburg ends the war between Russia and Prussia, and returns all of Russia's territorial conquests to the Prussians. 
 May 22 – The Treaty of Hamburg takes Sweden out of the war against Prussia. 
 May 26 – Dissatisfied with the progress of the French and Indian War, King George III dismisses his Prime Minister, the Duke of Newcastle, and replaces him with his former tutor, Tory politician John Stuart, 3rd Earl of Bute.  The Bute ministry lasts less than a year before Stuart's resignation in 1763.
 May 31 – Marco Foscarini becomes the new Doge of the Republic of Venice after the death of Francesco Loredan, who had administered the Republic for 10 years.
 June 8 – Cherokee Indian war chief Ostenaco and his two aides, Standing Turkey (Cunneshote) and Pouting Pigeon, are received by King George III. They had arrived three days earlier at Plymouth on the British frigate Epreuvre as guests of the Timberlake Expedition of Henry Timberlake, to discuss terms of peace with the British government.
 June 24 – Battle of Wilhelmsthal: The Anglo-Hanoverian army of Ferdinand of Brunswick defeats the French forces in Westphalia. The British commander Lord Granby distinguishes himself.

 July–September 
 July 9 – Catherine II becomes empress of Russia after planning the overthrow of her husband, the Tsar Peter III. The incipient Russo-Prussian alliance falls apart, but Russia does not rejoin the war.
 July 21 – Battle of Burkersdorf: In his last major battle, Frederick defeats Marshal Daun in Silesia.
 August 13 – Seven Years' War: The Battle of Havana concludes after more than two months, with the surrender of Havana by Spain to Great Britain.
21st August : King Prithvi Narayan Shah of Gorkha conquers Makwanpur.
  
 September 15
 French and Indian War: Battle of Signal Hill – British troops defeat the French in the last battle of the North American theatre of the Seven Years' War, fought in the Newfoundland Colony.
 Empress Go-Sakuramachi succeeds to the throne of Japan upon the death of her brother, the Emperor Momozono. She reigns for eight years before abdicating on January 9, 1771.
 September 24–October 6 – Battle of Manila: Troops of the British East India Company take Manila from the Spanish, leading to the British occupation of Manila and its being made an open port.

 October–December 
 October 5 – Orfeo ed Euridice by Cristoph Willibald Gluck was given its first performance. 
 October 29 – Battle of Freiberg: Prince Henry of Prussia, Frederick's brother, defeats the Austrian army of Marshal Serbelloni.
 November 13 – In the Treaty of Fontainebleau, Louis XV of France secretly cedes Louisiana (New France) to Charles III of Spain.
 December 4 – Less than six months after becoming Russia's Empress, Catherine the Great announces that almost all foreigners are welcome to travel to and settle in Russia, and waives previous requirements that new residents must be members of the Russian Orthodox Church; however, the manifesto adds the phrase  - "except the Jews".
 December 22 – Catherine follows the waiver of religious requirement for Russian immigration with a 190-word invitation, translated into various European languages, that invites Europeans to build settlements along arable, but undeveloped, land in southern Russia along the Volga River; when the invitation attracts little notice, she follows on July 22 with a longer manifesto promising free travel expenses and a written guarantee of rights.

 Date unknown 
 Louis XV orders the construction of the Petit Trianon, in the park of the Palace of Versailles, for his mistress Madame de Pompadour.
 Neolin, a Lenape prophet, begins to preach in America.
 The North Carolina General Assembly incorporates Kingston, named for King George III of the United Kingdom, as the county seat of Dobbs County, North Carolina. The name is later shortened to Kinston in 1784.
 The town of Charlottesville, Virginia is founded.
 The Plymouth Synagogue is built in Plymouth, England, the oldest built by Ashkenazi Jews in the English-speaking world.
 Philosopher Jean-Jacques Rousseau's The Social Contract (Du Contrat social, ou Principes du droit politique) and Emile, or On Education (Émile, ou De l’éducation) are published in Amsterdam and The Hague respectively. In Rousseau's native Republic of Geneva they are publicly burned and prohibited in Paris.
 James Stuart and Nicholas Revett's architectural treatise Antiquities of Athens is published.
 Istoriya Slavyanobolgarskaya is finished by Paisius of Hilendar.
 Approximate date of the foundation of Zubarah on the northwestern shore of the Qatari Peninsula, by Shaikh Mohamed bin Khalifa Al Khalifa, who assumes the chieftainship of the city state and gains authority over the Arab tribes in the area.

Births 
 February 17 – John Cooke, English captain (d. 1805)
 April 29 – Jean-Baptiste Jourdan, French marshal (d. 1833)
 May 19 – Johann Gottlieb Fichte, German philosopher (d. 1814)
 June 5 – Bushrod Washington, American politician and Associate Justice of the Supreme Court of the United States (d. 1829)
 August 12
 King George IV of the United Kingdom (d. 1830)
 Christoph Wilhelm Hufeland, German physician (d. 1836)
 August 13 – Théroigne de Méricourt, French revolutionary (d. 1817)
 September 11 – Joanna Baillie, Scottish writer (d. 1851)
 October 1 – Anton Bernolák, Slovak linguist (d. 1813)
 October 9 – Charles de Suremain, French military and diplomat (d. 1835) 
 October 12 – Jan Willem Janssens, Governor-General of the Dutch East Indies (d. 1838)
 October 21 – Herman Willem Daendels, governor-general of the Dutch East Indies (d. 1818)
 October 23 – Samuel Morey, American inventor (d. 1843)
 October 30 – André Chénier, French writer (d. 1794)
 November 1 – Spencer Perceval, Prime Minister of the United Kingdom (d. 1812)
 November – Manuel Torres, first Colombian ambassador to the United States (d. 1822)

Date unknown
 Birgithe Kühle, Norwegian journalist (d. 1832)
 Natalia Shelikhova, Russian business person (d. 1810)

Deaths 

 January 5 – Empress Elizabeth of Russia (b. 1709)
 January 7 – Manuel de Montiano, Spanish colonial administrator (b. 1685)
 January 11 – Louis-François Roubiliac, French sculptor (b. 1695)
 February 11 – Johann Tobias Krebs, German composer (b. 1690)
 February 12 – Laurent Belissen, French composer (b. 1693)
 February 20 – Tobias Mayer, German astronomer (b. 1723)
 March 4 – Johannes Zick, German fresco painter (b. 1702)
 March 18 – Paul II Anton, Prince Esterházy of Hungary (b. 1711)
 March 21 – Nicolas-Louis de Lacaille, French astronomer (b. 1713)
 April 1 – Germain Louis Chauvelin, French politician (b. 1685)
 May 15 – Michał Kazimierz "Rybeńko" Radziwiłł, Polish-Lithuanian noble (b. 1702)
 May 19 – Francesco Loredan, doge of Venice (b. 1685)
 May 21 – Alexander Joseph Sulkowski, Polish and Saxon general (b. 1695)
 May 26 – Alexander Gottlieb Baumgarten, German philosopher (b. 1714)
 June 13 – Dorothea Erxleben, German physician (b. 1715)
 June 17 – Prosper Jolyot de Crébillon, French writer (b. 1674)
 June 19 – Johann Ernst Eberlin, German composer (b. 1702)
 June 26 – Luise Gottsched, German poet, playwright, essayist and translator (b. 1713)
 July 12 – Prince Sado, son of Yeongjo of Joseon (b. 1735)
 July 13 – James Bradley, English Astronomer Royal (b. 1693)
 July 17 – Emperor Peter III of Russia (b. 1728)
 July 28 – George Dodington, 1st Baron Melcombe, English politician (b. 1691)
 July 31 – Luis Vicente de Velasco e Isla, Royal Spanish Navy sailor, commander (b. 1711)
 August 20 – Shah Waliullah, Islamic reformer (b. 1703)
 August 21 – Lady Mary Wortley Montagu, English writer (b. 1689)
 August 31 – Emperor Momozono of Japan (b. 1741)
 August 26 – John Fane, 7th Earl of Westmorland, British politician (b. 1685)
 September 17 – Francesco Geminiani, Italian composer (b. 1687)
 October 5 – John Olmius, 1st Baron Waltham of Ireland (b. 1711)
 October 6 – Francesco Manfredini, Italian composer (b. 1684)
 November 16 – John Boyle, 5th Earl of Cork, Irish writer (b. 1707)
 November 19 – Lord Robert Manners-Sutton, British politician (b. 1722)
 date unknown – William Moraley, English-American indentured servant and autobiographer (b. 1698)

References